Ian Jones may refer to:

Ian Jones (athlete), British bronze medal winner at the 2008 Summer Paralympics
Ian Jones (author) (1931–2018), Australian author and film writer
Ian Jones (cricketer) (born 1977), English cricketer
Ian Jones (curler) (born 1968), Welsh wheelchair curler
Ian Jones (Australian footballer) (born 1932), Australian rules footballer
Ian Jones (Welsh footballer) (born 1976), German-born footballer
Ian Jones (rugby union, born 1967) (born 1967), New-Zealand rugby player
Ian Jones (sportsman, born 1934), English sportsman and academic
Ian Jones (television executive), chief executive of S4C
Ian Quayle Jones (born 1941), British banker
Ian Jones-Quartey (born 1984), writer, storyboard artist, animator and voice actor